Dance Club Songs was a chart published weekly by Billboard magazine in the United States, which ranked the popularity of songs in nightclubs across the country, based on a national survey of club disc jockeys.  In 1977 it was published under the title National Disco Action, combining the data from 15 major markets, and there were 12 different number ones.  The chart methodology of the time allowed for multiple songs ("cuts") from a 12-inch single or album to be bracketed together as a single listing if more than one track from the release was receiving significant play in clubs.

Thelma Houston had the year's first number one, spending her second consecutive week at number one with "Don't Leave Me This Way" and "Any Way You Like It" on the chart dated January 1.  The songs remained atop the chart through the issue dated January 29, before being displaced by "Disco Inferno", "Starvin'", and "Body Contact Contract" by the Trammps, three songs from the group's album Disco Inferno.  "Don't Leave Me This Way" was the only song to top both the disco chart and the all-genre Hot 100 during 1977, although it did not reach the top spot on the Hot 100 until late April, nearly four months after it first topped the disco listing.  In contrast, neither of the two songs by Love & Kisses which topped the disco chart entered the Hot 100 at all.  The Eurodisco act's lengthy tracks proved extremely popular with nightclub DJs but were generally not deemed suitable for top 40 radio airplay, limiting their mainstream appeal.

The band Chic achieved the year's longest-running number one, spending eight consecutive weeks atop the chart with "Dance, Dance, Dance (Yowsah, Yowsah, Yowsah)".  For the final two weeks, the song "Everybody Dance" was also listed.  The eight weeks which the songs spent at number also made Chic the act with the highest total number of weeks in the top spot during 1977, one week ahead of Village People.  The only act with more than one number one during the year was Donna Summer, known as the "Queen of Disco".  Combined tracks from her album I Remember Yesterday spent three weeks in the peak position in July, and in December she returned to the top spot with all the cuts from her next album Once Upon a Time; this was the year's final chart-topper.

Chart history

Notes

See also
1977 in music
List of number-one dance hits (United States)
List of artists who reached number one on the U.S. Dance chart

References

1977
1977 record charts
1977 in American music